OTFC may refer to:

On-The-Fly Calibration
Ossett Town F.C.